Bioinformatics (sometimes called Bioinformatics Oxford journal) is a biweekly peer-reviewed scientific journal covering research and software in bioinformatics and computational biology. It is the official journal of the International Society for Computational Biology (ISCB), together with PLOS Computational Biology. Authors can pay extra for open access and are allowed to self-archive after 1 year.

The journal was established as Computer Applications in the Biosciences (CABIOS) in 1985. The founding editor-in-chief was Robert J. Beynon. In 1998, the journal obtained its current name and established an online version of the journal. It is published by Oxford University Press and, as of 2014, the editors-in-chief are Alfonso Valencia and Janet Kelso. Previous editors include Chris Sander, Gary Stormo, Christos Ouzounis, Martin Bishop, and Alex Bateman. In 2014, these five editors were appointed the first Honorary Editors of Bioinformatics. According to the Journal Citation Reports, the journal has a 2019 impact factor of 5.610

From 1998 to 2004, Bioinformatics was the official journal of the ISCB. In 2004, as many ISCB members had institutional subscriptions to Bioinformatics, ISCB decided not to renew its contract with the journal. As of 2005, PLOS Computational Biology became the official ISCB journal. In January 2009 Bioinformatics again became an official journal of the ISCB, alongside PLOS Computational Biology.

The proceedings of the Intelligent Systems for Molecular Biology conference and the European Conference on Computational Biology have been published in special issues of Bioinformatics since 2001 and 2002, respectively.

Following budget problems, Greek universities dropped their subscriptions to Bioinformatics in 2013.

References

External links 
 

Bioinformatics and computational biology journals
Publications established in 1998
Biweekly journals
Oxford University Press academic journals
English-language journals